Collocational restriction is a linguistic term used in morphology. The term refers to the fact that in certain two-word phrases the meaning of an individual word is restricted to that particular phrase (cf. idiom). For instance: the adjective dry can only mean 'not sweet' in combination with the noun wine.

A more illustrative example is the one given below:

white wine
white coffee
white noise
white rook
white man

All five instances of white can be said to be idiomatic because in combination with certain nouns the meaning of white changes. In none of the examples does white have its commonest meaning. Instead, in the examples above it means 'yellowish', 'brownish', 'containing many frequencies with about equal amplitude', 'light-coloured' and 'pinkish' or 'pale brown', respectively.

Bibliography

 Crystal, D. (2003), A Dictionary of Linguistics and Phonetics, Blackwell, Oxford.

See also
Collocation

Linguistic morphology